Knights of Power is an album by James Blood Ulmer's Music Revelation Ensemble, with guest saxophonists Arthur Blythe and Hamiet Bluiett, recorded in 1995 and released on the Japanese DIW label.

Reception
The AllMusic review by Thom Jurek stated: "Along with No Wave, this is the best of the Music Revelation Ensemble's recordings; it kicks ass". Jazz Review'''s  Lee Prosser awarded the album 4 stars, enthusing: "This CD mixes funk, fusion and straight jazz idioms into a blend that is fresh and high energy. Question! Is some new jazz starting to meld together? THIS WILL WAKE YOU UP . Find this gem ....... and you will understand why it is called KNIGHTS OF POWER 
. 

Track listingAll compositions by James Blood Ulmer''
 "The Scandal Monger" – 5:33   
 "The Day Of" – 7:55   
 "Convulsion" – 7:48   
 "Noise and Clamor" – 6:44   
 "The Elephant" – 9:46   
 "Father of Flame" – 4:12   
 "Quarish" – 5:09   
 "Back Biter" – 7:17

Personnel
James Blood Ulmer – guitar
Amin Ali – electric bass
Cornell Rochester – drums
Arthur Blythe – alto saxophone (tracks 1, 2, 5 & 7)
Hamiet Bluiett – baritone saxophone (tracks 3, 4, 6 & 8)

References 

1996 albums
James Blood Ulmer albums
DIW Records albums